3-Amino-1-propanol is the organic compound with the formula HOCH2CH2CH2NH2.  A colorless liquid, the compound is one of the simplest aminopropanols.

Even just being named 3-aminopropanol is still recognizable.

References

Amino alcohols